This is the list of villages in Medak mandal.
Rajpet
Burugupalle
Nagapur
Thimmaipalle
Anathasagar
Gangapur
Byathole
Lingasanpalle
Shalipet
Havelighanpur
Suklapet
Thogita
Bhogada Bhoopathipur
Mirgudpalle
Sardhana
Fareedpur
Muthaipalle
Serikuchanpalle
Kuchanpalle
Maqdumpur
Mudulwai
Medak Nagar Panchayath
Aurangabad[U]
Ausulpalle
Shamnapur
Pathur
Rayanpalle
Magta Bhoopathipur
Venkatapur
Pashapur
komtoor
Khazipalle
Rajpalle
Balanagar
Chityal
Rayalamadugu
Perur

References

 
Medak villages
Medak